Tête-à-tête (French for "face to face", literally "head to head") may refer to:

Music
 Tête à Tête (opera company), a British opera company based in Cornwall
 Tête-à-Tête (Art Pepper and George Cables album), 1983
 Tête à Tete (Tete Montoliu album), 1976
 Tête à Tête, an album by ABBC, a collaboration between Amor Belhom Duo and Calexico, 2001
 Tête à tête, an album by Murray Head, 2007

Other uses
 Tête-à-tête (book), a 2006 book about Jean-Paul Sartre and Simone de Beauvoir, by Hazel Rowley
 Tête-à-tête (furniture), a type of loveseat
 Narcissus 'Tête-à-tête', a daffodil cultivar

See also
 Tête à Tête à Tête, a sculpture by Marcia Donahue, in Brooklyn Park (Portland, Oregon), US
 Face to Face (disambiguation)